The 2006 Cyprus Rally was the twelfth round of the 2006 World Rally Championship season. It took place between September 22-24, 2006. It was the last event of the season in which championship winner Sébastien Loeb competed due to injury; despite this, he still became 2006 Champion when his points total became unassailable in the fourteenth round, 2006 Rally Australia.

Results

Special Stages
All dates and times are EEST (UTC+3).

External links

 Results at eWRC.com
 Results at Jonkka's World Rally Archive

Cyprus
Cyprus Rally
Rally